Bleed the Future is the fourth studio album by Canadian technical death metal band Archspire, released on October 29, 2021, through Season of Mist. The album won the 2022 Juno Award for Metal/Hard Music Album of the Year. The album sold 3,700 units in its first week and debuted at No. 29 on the Top Album Sales charts.

Promotion and release 

In March 2020, Archspire announced they were rescheduling the "Tech Trek Canada" tour which they were set to headline with support from Soreption, Entheos, and Wormhole. The band announced that while self-isolating as per CDC guidelines, they would be using their time to continue to write the follow up to 2017's Relentless Mutation. The band announced they were entering the studio in October 2020 to finish the album. They would once again be working with Dave Otero at Flatline studios in Denver. They would announce that they'd finished recording in Demeber of 2020, and noted that the album was a product of roughly two and a half years of writing adding that the "album is very fast, so please enjoy responsibly."

On August 4, 2021, the band released the first single for the album, "Golden Mouth of Ruin", alongside an accompanying music video. The band also announced the release date and provided the track listing for the album. The band would release a lyric video to accompany the title track on September 3, and a music video directed by Rob Zawistowski and Mitch Ray for "Drone Corpse Aviator" on september 30.

In December, the band released a documentary "Bring back the Danger" cataloguing the making of the album.

Reception

The album finished at No. 16 on Loudwire's Best Rock and Metal Albums of 2021 list. It was also named by MetalInjection as one of the best Technical Death Metal albums of 2021, with vocalist Oli Peters winning vocalist of the year and the album finishing 4th in fan poling.

Chart performance
The album debuted at number No. 7 on the Billboard Heatseekers chart, No. 25 on the Hard Rock Album chart, and No. 8 on the Independent Albums chart.

Track listing

Personnel
Archspire
 Oliver Rae Aleron – vocals
 Tobi Morelli – guitars
 Dean Lamb – guitars
 Jared Smith – bass
 Spencer Prewett – drums

Production
 Dave Otero – production, engineering, mixing, mastering
 Eliran Kantor – cover art

Charts

References

2021 albums
Archspire albums